George F. Hall may refer to:

George F. Hall, founder of Hall City, Florida
George F. Hall, architect and partner in the firm Martin & Hall